Sapucaí may refer to the following places:

Sapucaí, a town in southern Paraguay
Sapucaí-Mirim, a municipality in Minas Gerais, Brazil
rivers in Brazil:
Sapucaí River (Minas Gerais), a tributary of the Rio Grande in Minas Gerais 
Sapucaí River (São Paulo), a tributary of the Rio Grande in São Paulo 
Sapucaí-Mirim River, a tributary of the Sapucaí River (Minas Gerais) in Minas Gerais and São Paulo 
Sambadrome Marquês de Sapucaí, a parade area in Rio de Janeiro, Brazil